

History and general
Afonsky, Bp. Gregory.  A History of the Orthodox Church in Alaska, 1794-1917.  Kodiak: Saint Herman's Theological Seminary Press, 1977.  (ISBN B0006CUQ42)
Afonsky, Bp. Gregory.  A History of the Orthodox Church in America, 1917-1934. Kodiak: Saint Herman's Theological Seminary Press, 1994.
Apostolos, Nicholas K.  "Moving Toward an Administratively United Church."  St. Vladimir's Theological Quarterly 40, 1-2 (1996): 95-114.
FitzGerald, Thomas E. The Orthodox Church.  Westport, CT: Praeger Publishers, 1998.
Kishkovsky, Leonid.  Orthodoxy Today: Tradition or Traditionalism?, 2005.
Michalopoulos, George C. and Herb Ham. The American Orthodox Church: A History of Its Beginnings.  Salisbury: Regina Orthodox Press, 2003.
Moss, Vladimir.   The Orthodox Church in the Twentieth Century
Russian Autocephaly and Orthodoxy in America: An Appraisal with Decisions and Formal Opinions.  New York: The Orthodox Observer Press, 1972.
Surrency, Archim. Serafim. The Quest for Orthodox Church Unity in America: A History of the Orthodox Church in North America in the Twentieth Century.  New York: Saints Boris and Gleb Press, 1973.
Vrame, Anton C., ed.  The Orthodox Parish in America: Faithfulness to the Past and Responsibility for the Future.  Brookline: Holy Cross Orthodox Press, 2003.
Woerl, Michael. Book Review: A History of the Orthodox Church in America (1917-1934)

Jurisdictions

Antiochian
Corey, George et al., eds.  The First One Hundred Years: A Centennial Anthology Celebrating Antiochian Orthodoxy in North America.  Englewood: Antakya Press, 1995. 
Gabriel, Antony.  The Ancient Church on New Shores: Antioch in North America.  San Bernardino: St. Willibrord's Press, 1996. 
Gillquist, Peter E.  Becoming Orthodox: A Journey to the Ancient Christian Faith.  Ben Lomond: Conciliar Press, 1992. 

Carpatho-Russian
Barriger, Lawrence.  The American Carpatho-Russian Orthodox Greek Catholic Diocese: A History and Chronology.  San Bernardino: St. Willibrord's Press, 1999. 
Barriger, Lawrence.  Glory to Jesus Christ!: History of the American Carpatho-Russian Orthodox Church.  Brookline: Holy Cross Orthodox Press, 2000. 
Barriger, Lawrence.  Good Victory: Metropolitan Orestes Chornock and the American Carpatho-Russian Orthodox Greek Catholic Diocese.  Brookline: Holy Cross Orthodox Press, 1985. 

Greek
Coucouzis, Abp. Iakovos.  The Greek Orthodox priest as a leader in America.  New York: Greek Orthodox Archiocese of North and South America. Dept. of Interchurch Relations and Social Concerns, 1976.  (ISBN B0007313BU)
Efthimiou, Miltiades B., et al., eds. History of the Greek Orthodox Church in America. New York: Greek Orthodox Archdiocese of North and South America, 1984.
Manolis, Paul.  The History of the Greek Church in America: In Acts and Documents. Berkeley: Ambelos Press, 2003. 
Papaioannou, George. From Mars Hill to Manhattan: The Greek Orthodox in America under Athenagoras I. Minneapolis: Light and Life, 1976.

Orthodox Church in America (OCA)
Bogolepov, Alexander A. Toward an American Orthodox Church: The Establishment of an Autocephalous Orthodox Church. New York: Morehouse-Barlow Company, 1963.
Liberovsky, Alexis.  All-American Sobors and Councils.
Ramet, Pedro, ed.  Eastern Christianity and Politics in the Twentieth Century.  Durham and London: Duke University Press, 1988, pp. 116–134.
Smith, Barbara. Orthodoxy and Native Americans: The Alaskan Mission. Syosset, NY: Orthodox Church in America, Dept. of History and Archives, 1980.
Stokoe, Mark and Leonid Kishkovsky. Orthodox Christians in North America 1794 - 1994

Russian Orthodox Church Outside Russia (ROCOR)
Budzilovich, P.N. A Summary-View of the Three Previous ROCA Sobors, 2000
Holy Transfiguration Monastery. A History of the Russian Church Abroad and the events leading to the American Metropolia's autocephaly, 1917-1971.  Seattle: Saint Nectarios Press, 1972. 
Maximovitch, St. John. History of the Russian Orthodox Church Abroad (from The Orthodox Word, 1971)
Ramet, Pedro, ed.  Eastern Christianity and Politics in the Twentieth Century.  Durham and London: Duke University Press, 1988, pp. 135–145.
Rodzianko, M. The Truth About the Russian Church Abroad, 1954 (tr. 1975)
Young, Alexey.  The Russian Orthodox Church Outside Russia: A History and Chronology. San Bernardino: St. Willibrord's Press, 1993. 

Romanian
Hategan, Vasile.  Fifty years of the Romanian Orthodox Church in America.  Jackson, MI: Romanian Orthodox Episcopate of America, 1959.

Serbian

Biography
Chamberas, Peter A., ed.  Bishop Gerasimos of Abydos: The Spiritual Elder of America.  Brookline: Holy Cross Orthodox Press, 1997. 
Christensen, Damascene.  Father Seraphim Rose: His Life and Works.  Platina: St. Xenia Skete Press, 2003. 
Christensen, Damascene.  Not of This World: The Life and Teaching of Fr. Seraphim Rose. Forestville: Fr. Seraphim Rose Foundation, 1993. 
Frangouli-Argyris, Justine.  The Lonely Path of Integrity (Spyridon, Archbishop of America, 1996-1999).  Athens: Exandas Publishers, 2000. 
Ofiesh, Mariam Namey . Archbishop Aftimios Ofiesh (1880-1966): A Biography Revealing His Contribution to Orthodoxy and Christendom. Sun City West, AZ: Abihider Co., 1999.

Eastern Orthodoxy in the United States
Eastern Orthodoxy in the United States